Tmesisternus hieroglyphicus is a species of beetle in the family Cerambycidae. It was described by Blanchard in 1853. It is known from Papua New Guinea.

References

hieroglyphicus
Beetles described in 1853